North Carolina's 29th Senate district is one of 50 districts in the North Carolina Senate. It has been represented by Republican Dave Craven since 2023.

Geography
Since 2023, the district has included all of Montgomery, Richmond, and Anson counties, as well as parts of Randolph and Union counties. The district overlaps with the 52nd, 55th, 67th, 70th, and 78th state house districts.

District officeholders

Election results

2022

2020

2018

2016

2014

2012

2010

2008

2006

2004

2002

2000

References

North Carolina Senate districts
Randolph County, North Carolina
Montgomery County, North Carolina
Richmond County, North Carolina
Anson County, North Carolina
Union County, North Carolina